Nižbor is a municipality and village in Beroun District in the Central Bohemian Region of the Czech Republic. It has about 2,100 inhabitants.

Administrative parts
Villages of Stradonice and Žloukovice are administrative parts of Nižbor.

Etymology
The local castle was originally named Miesenburg, meaning "castle upon Mže"). Later it was distorted to Nižbor.

Geography
It lies in the Křivoklát Highlands, in the Křivoklátsko Protected Landscape Area. The town is situated on the Berounka River.

History
The first written mention of Nižbor is from 1265, when Nižbor Castle was founded by King Ottokar II. The castle became an important centre of the region. In 1425, it was conquered by the Hussites. Nižbor was a royal property until 1601. From 1510 to 1601, however, it was granted to the Otta of Los family. During their rule, an iron smelter was established here and there was an influx of new inhabitants.

In 1601–1613, Nižbor was owned by the Šanovec family, who had rebuilt the castle. The Waldstein family acquired the estate during the Thirty Years' War and annexed it to the neighbouring Křivoklát estate. In 1731, the Waldsteins sold the Křivoklát estate with Nižbor to the Fürstenberg family, who owned it until 1929.

Until 1918, Nižbor, then known as Nischburg, was part of the Austria-Hungary (after the compromise of 1867, in Cisleithania), located in the Rakonitz (present-day Rakovník) district, one of the 94 Bezirkshauptmannschaften in Bohemia.

Demographics

Economy
Nibor is known for the Nižbor glassworks, a Bohemian crystal factory founded in 1903.

Sights

The most important monument is the Nižbor Castle. The original medieval castle was rebuilt into a Renaissance residence n the early 17th century, then it was completely rebuilt in the Baroque style in 1720–1725. It was rebuilt by the architect František Maxmilián Kaňka. Today the castle is open to the public. It houses the Information centre of Celtic culture.

The Church of the Exaltation of the Holy Cross was built in the Baroque style in 1724. It was built on the site of the Gothic castle chapel next to the castle.

A cultural monument is the Fürstenberg Tomb. The burial ground of the Fürstenberg family with a number of sepulchral objects was built from 1787 until the mid-19th century.

References

External links

 
Villages in the Beroun District